Czajcze may refer to:

Czajcze, Piła County in Greater Poland Voivodeship (west-central Poland)
Czajcze, Złotów County in Greater Poland Voivodeship (west-central Poland)
Czajcze, West Pomeranian Voivodeship (north-west Poland)